Southern Ontario Secondary Schools Association, or SOSSA, is member of OFSAA and the regional governing body of all secondary school athletic competitions between within the Niagara and Hamilton area representing schools for the Council Scolaire De District Du Centre Sud-Ouest, District School Board of Niagara, Hamilton-Wentworth District School Board, Niagara Catholic District School Board, Grand Erie District School Board (shared with CWOSSA), Couseil Scolaire De District Catholique Centre-Sud and Independent Schools within the Association

Zones 
SOSSA is divided into four zones that have their own individual championships that qualify teams and student-athletes for the SOSSA championships for all sports. 
 Zone #1 - Hamilton-Wentworth District School Board and independent schools presently members of zone #1.
 Zone #2 - N.C.A.A. member schools.
 Zone #3 - N.R.H.S.A.A. schools and independent schools presently members of zone #3.
 Zone #4 - N.R.H.S.A.A. schools and independent schools presently members of zone #4.

SOSSA Championships
Each year SOSSA contests championships in the following sports 

Alpine skiing
Badminton
Baseball
Basketball
Cross country
Curling
Field hockey
Field lacrosse
Football
Golf
Hockey
Rugby union
Soccer
Snowboarding
Swimming
Tennis
Track and field
Ultimate
Volleyball
Wrestling

External links
Southern Ontario Secondary Schools Association (SOSSA)
Hamilton Wentworth District School Board Athletics (HWDSB)
Niagara Catholic Athletic Association (NCAA)
Niagara Region High School Athletic Association (NRHSAA)

See also
Ontario Federation of School Athletic Associations

References 

Educational organizations based in Ontario